Ooredoo Palestine  (formerly Wataniya Mobile Palestine  Telecommunication Company or Wataniya Mobile for short) is one of the two mobile network operators in the West Bank (the other being Jawwal), founded in November 2009. It describes itself as a member of the Ooredoo Group, and it is 48.45% owned by Ooredoo, 34.03% by the Palestine Investment Fund, and 17.52% by others (freely traded).
The chairman is Mohammed Abu Ramadan, who was formerly Palestinian Minister of State for Planning, and the CEO is Durgham Maraee. Ooredoo had 610,000 subscribers by the end of 2012, a 28% market share, and was the third largest company on the Palestine Exchange by market capitalization, representing 13.8% of the Al-Quds Index.

Wataniya Palestine was started life as the mobile network, of which the majority owner was being Qtel (now Ooredoo).

References

External links

Telecommunications companies established in 2009
Mobile phone companies of the State of Palestine
Palestine
2009 establishments in the Palestinian territories